Acanthocheila is a genus of lace bugs in the family Tingidae. There are about 17 described species in Acanthocheila.

Species
These 17 species belong to the genus Acanthocheila:

 Acanthocheila abducta Buchanan-White, 1879
 Acanthocheila apicicornis Monte, 1940
 Acanthocheila armigera (Stal, 1858)
 Acanthocheila comentis Drake, 1953
 Acanthocheila comitis Drake, 1948
 Acanthocheila denieri Monte, 1940
 Acanthocheila dira Drake & Hambleton, 1945
 Acanthocheila exquisita Uhler, 1889
 Acanthocheila hollandi Drake, 1935
 Acanthocheila nexa Drake, 1936
 Acanthocheila nigriscens Drake & Bondar, 1932
 Acanthocheila rustica Monte, 1942
 Acanthocheila sigillata Drake & Bruner, 1924
 Acanthocheila spinicosta Van Duzee, 1907
 Acanthocheila thaumana Drake & Cobben, 1960
 Acanthocheila tumida Drake, 1924
 Acanthocheila visenda Drake & Hambleton, 1934

References

Further reading

 
 
 
 

Tingidae
Articles created by Qbugbot